Emanuel Centurión (born 25 August 1982) is an Argentine football midfielder.

Career
Born in Lomas de Zamora, Centurión started his career in 2001 with Vélez Sársfield. Between 2003 and 2004 he played for VfB Stuttgart in Germany.

In 2005 Centurión returned to Velez and helped them to win the Clausura 2005 tournament.

Centurión left Vélez to join Colón for the 2006 Clausura, and was signed by Mexican side Atlas in January 2008. His Mexican spell would be short-lived however, Centurión returning to Argentina with Buenos Aires club Independiente for the start of the 2008 Apertura Tournament.

Honours
Vélez Sársfield
Primera División Argentina: Clausura 2005

References

External links
 
 Argentine Primera statistics at Fútbol XXI  
 Emanuel Centurión at BDFA

1982 births
Living people
People from Lomas de Zamora
Argentine footballers
Argentine expatriate footballers
Association football midfielders
Club Atlético Vélez Sarsfield footballers
VfB Stuttgart players
Club Atlético Colón footballers
Club Atlético Independiente footballers
Atlas F.C. footballers
Chacarita Juniors footballers
Universidad de Chile footballers
Sud América players
Independiente Rivadavia footballers
Argentine Primera División players
Primera Nacional players
Torneo Argentino A players
Bundesliga players
Chilean Primera División players
Liga MX players
Expatriate footballers in Chile
Expatriate footballers in Mexico
Expatriate footballers in Germany
Expatriate footballers in Uruguay
Argentine expatriate sportspeople in Germany
Argentine expatriate sportspeople in Mexico
Argentine expatriate sportspeople in Uruguay
Argentine expatriate sportspeople in Chile
Sportspeople from Buenos Aires Province